Saidi Expressway is an expressway in western Tehran. It starts from Azadi Square and passes Fath Square, Qazvin Street, Yaftabad Street and Zam-zam Square. Then it goes to southwest towards Azadegan Expressway and Saveh Road.

Expressways in Tehran